Clypeostoma salpinx is a species of sea snail, a marine gastropod mollusk in the family Chilodontidae.

Description
The size of the shell varies between 8 mm and 12 mm.

Distribution
This marine species occurs off South Africa.

References

External links
 To World Register of Marine Species
 

Endemic fauna of South Africa
salpinx
Gastropods described in 1964